Chancellor Records was a record label associated with ABC-Paramount Records, which initially distributed the smaller label. Based in Philadelphia, it was an integral part of the dominance of popular Philadelphia artists and music in the late 1950s and early 1960s.

Its first hit was "With All My Heart" sung by Jodie Sands (1957), but the major artists the label was famous for were Frankie Avalon and Fabian Forte, and later Claudine Clark. The studio drummer for Chancellor Records was Charles Pasco who played for all of the artists that recorded there. The label was owned by Bob Marcucci, originally with partner Peter De Angelis; Ray Sharkey played a version of Marcucci in the movie The Idolmaker [1980].

The record label also had the imprint "Chancellor Country" which was also distributed by ABC-Paramount Records.

See also 
 List of record labels

External links
 Website

Defunct record labels of the United States